SZSE 200 Index are indice of Shenzhen Stock Exchange. It consists of SZSE 200 Price Index and SZSE 200 Return Index, using the same constituents but different methodology.

It was a sub-index of SZSE 300 Index, which consists of all constituents of SZSE 300 that was not included in SZSE 100 Index.

Constituents

Change history

References
general
 
specific

Chinese stock market indices
Shenzhen Stock Exchange